Shannonomyia is a genus of crane fly in the family Limoniidae.

Species
Subgenus Roraimomyia Alexander, 1935
S. exilipes Alexander, 1979
S. permonstrata (Alexander, 1935)
Subgenus hannonomyia Alexander, 1929

S. abortiva Alexander, 1967
S. abra Alexander, 1949
S. adumbrata Alexander, 1946
S. aenigmatica Alexander, 1929
S. antarctica (Walker, 1837)
S. araguae Alexander, 1947
S. argenticeps Alexander, 1929
S. atroapicalis Alexander, 1934
S. austrolathraea Alexander, 1930
S. barilochensis Alexander, 1929
S. batesi Alexander, 1939
S. bogotensis Alexander, 1938
S. brevicula Alexander, 1931
S. brevinervis Alexander, 1929
S. bruneriana Alexander, 1937
S. bullockiana (Alexander, 1940)
S. cacoxena Alexander, 1929
S. caesia Alexander, 1937
S. cerbereana Alexander, 1946
S. cineracea (Philippi, 1866)
S. cingara Alexander, 1948
S. congenita (Dietz, 1921)
S. crassicornis Alexander, 1964
S. crepera Alexander, 1978
S. dampfi Alexander, 1939
S. dilatistyla Alexander, 1971
S. erubescens Alexander, 1944
S. evanescens Alexander, 1978
S. exilifila Alexander, 1980
S. exilostyla Alexander, 1971
S. feriata (Alexander, 1929)
S. fuscostigmalis (Alexander, 1967)
S. galindoi Alexander, 1978
S. globulicornis Alexander, 1968
S. gracilior Alexander, 1944
S. gurneyana Alexander, 1976
S. haitensis Alexander, 1939
S. halterata Alexander, 1967
S. hoffmani Alexander, 1936
S. ignava Alexander, 1943
S. jaffueli Alexander, 1928
S. justa Alexander, 1937
S. kuscheli Alexander, 1952
S. lathraea (Alexander, 1926)
S. lenitatis Alexander, 1946
S. lenta (Osten Sacken, 1860)
S. lentina Alexander, 1928
S. lentoides (Alexander, 1913)
S. leonardi Alexander, 1933
S. lignyptera Alexander, 1978
S. lipernes Alexander, 1971
S. longiradialis Alexander, 1929
S. masatierrae Alexander, 1952
S. mesophragma Alexander, 1928
S. mesophragmoides Alexander, 1937
S. microstyla Alexander, 1971
S. minutipennis Alexander, 1929
S. moctezuma Alexander, 1928
S. multisetosa Alexander, 1979
S. myersiana Alexander, 1931
S. nacrea (Alexander, 1913)
S. nebrioptera Alexander, 1979
S. neoseclusa Alexander, 1969
S. nudipennis Alexander, 1964
S. olssoni (Alexander, 1919)
S. orophila (Alexander, 1913)
S. oslari (Alexander, 1916)
S. ovaliformis Alexander, 1946
S. paraguayensis Alexander, 1929
S. parvicellula Alexander, 1968
S. penumbrosa Alexander, 1940
S. perreticularis Alexander, 1979
S. phaeostigmosa Alexander, 1943
S. phragmophora Alexander, 1937
S. pomerantzi Alexander, 1964
S. protuberans Alexander, 1946
S. providens Alexander, 1950
S. reticularis Alexander, 1979
S. roraimensis Alexander, 1935
S. scaramuzzai Alexander, 1937
S. seclusa (Alexander, 1928)
S. selkirkiana Alexander, 1952
S. semireducta Alexander, 1970
S. septempunctata Alexander, 1939
S. setulicornis Alexander, 1971
S. sopora Alexander, 1944
S. sparsipunctata Alexander, 1940
S. sparsissima (Alexander, 1929)
S. stigmatica (Philippi, 1866)
S. subexillipes Alexander, 1979
S. subsopora Alexander, 1979
S. subumbra Alexander, 1980
S. torus Alexander, 1979
S. triangularis (Alexander, 1927)
S. trichophora Alexander, 1979
S. tuber (Alexander, 1953)
S. umbra Alexander, 1948
S. urophora Alexander, 1970
S. vocator Alexander, 1944
S. zernyana Alexander, 1949

References

Limoniidae